Kate Todd (born December 12, 1987) is a Canadian actress and singer-songwriter. She is best known for her roles as Lily Randall in Radio Free Roscoe and Sally in Life with Derek. She is also known for her continuing role as Erica in the movie and series My Babysitter's a Vampire and had a recurring role in the Canadian drama series The L.A. Complex as Katee.

Early life
Todd grew up in Innisfil, Ontario, where she attended Nantyr Shores Secondary School, graduating with honors and earning the distinction of receiving a designate Ontario Scholar award. Throughout her youth she was known as Katie, but changed to Kate when she started acting.

Career
Todd got her acting start at age fourteen when she landed the lead role of Lily Randall on the popular television series Radio Free Roscoe. The show ran for two seasons, received the ‘Best Teen Show’ award and the ‘Parent’s Choice’ award at the New York Worlds Festival in 2003 and a Gemini award in 2005, and continues to be aired in Canada, the United States, and many countries throughout the world.

In 2006, Todd performed in the feature film The Tracey Fragments. She also played the lead role of Lauren Findley in the movie Grizzly Rage. She also made appearances on the TV shows Naturally, Sadie and in Life with Derek, in which she had a recurring role as Sally.

Todd has since appeared in a Lifetime Movie of the Week, More Sex and the Single Mom, and the CBC movie Booky Makes Her Mark. She also had a main role as Erica, a teenage vampire, in the series My Babysitter's a Vampire.

Music career
Todd released her debut album Finding My Way in April 2012. She won Best New Album at the 2012 Radio Nation Music Awards. In 2014 she released a Christmas album Country Christmas.  Todd released her sophomore album Anywhere With You in April 2015. On February 26, 2016 Todd released the single Should've Told feat. Kyle Shedrick.

Activism 
Todd has been involved with the KidsFest Canada charity, a non-government funded program designed to help fight child poverty.

In 2011, Todd appeared at the Party for Freedom at York University in Toronto, Ontario, Canada which launched the Alliance Against Modern Slavery, a nonprofit organization seeking to combat human trafficking through partnerships, education, and research. At this event, Todd was joined by Glendene Grant, human trafficking victim Jessie Foster's mother; Kevin Bales, co-founder and president of Free the Slaves; Roger Cram of Hiram College; Janelle Belgrave of Samba Elégua Drummers and Peace Concept; Natasha Falle, a survivor of human trafficking; and Jeff Gunn, a guitarist.

Discography

Studio albums

Extended plays

Singles

As main artist

As featuring artist

Promotional singles

Music videos

Filmography

Awards and nominations

References

External links
 
 

1987 births
Actresses from Ontario
Canadian child actresses
Canadian women singer-songwriters
Canadian women country singers
Canadian country singer-songwriters
Female models from Ontario
Canadian television actresses
Canadian voice actresses
Living people
Musicians from Barrie
21st-century Canadian women singers